Aptinoma is a small genus of arboreal ants in the subfamily Dolichoderinae. Its two species are known only from Antongil Bay, Madagascar.

Species
 Aptinoma antongil Fisher, 2009
 Aptinoma mangabe Fisher, 2009

References

External links

Dolichoderinae
Ant genera
Hymenoptera of Africa